Radha Krishan Sharma is an Indian politician and a member of 17th Legislative Assembly, Uttar Pradesh of India. He represents the ‘Bilsi’ constituency in Badaun district of Uttar Pradesh.

Political career
Radha Krishan Sharma contested Uttar Pradesh Assembly Election as Bharatiya Janata Party candidate and defeated his close contestant Musarrat Ali Bittan from Bahujan Samaj Party with a margin of 26,979 votes.

Posts held

References

Uttar Pradesh MLAs 2017–2022
Living people
Year of birth missing (living people)
Samajwadi Party politicians
Bharatiya Janata Party politicians from Uttar Pradesh